John McCormick Lea (1818–1903) was an American Whig politician. He served as the Mayor of Nashville, Tennessee from 1849 to 1850.

Early life
Lea was born in Knoxville, Tennessee on December 25, 1818. He graduated from the University of Nashville. His father was Luke Lea (1783–1851), a United States Representative from Tennessee, and his mother, Susan Wells McCormick.

Career
Lea was a lawyer and a circuit judge. He served as vice-president of First American National Bank. He served as President of the Board of Trustees of the University of Nashville. From 1842 to 1845, he served as Assistant U.S. District Attorney. From 1849 to 1850, he served as Mayor of Nashville. He was part of the commission to surrender Nashville to the Union Army in February 1862. From 1888 to 1903, he served as president of the Tennessee Historical Society.

Personal life and death
Lea married Elizabeth Overton in 1843. They had three sons, Overton, Robert B. and Luke Lea. He attended the First Presbyterian Church. He died in Monteagle, Tennessee on September 21, 1903, and he is buried at Mount Olivet Cemetery.

References
Robert Ambrose Halley, John McCormick Lea, the ideal citizen: A biographical sketch (Cumberland Press, 1904).

1818 births
1903 deaths
Politicians from Knoxville, Tennessee
Tennessee Whigs
19th-century American politicians
Mayors of Nashville, Tennessee